Władysław Karaś (31 August 1893 – 28 May 1942) was a Polish military officer and sport shooter who competed in the 1936 Summer Olympics. In 1936 he won the bronze medal in the 50 metre rifle prone event.

He was born in Kielce and died in Magdalenka.  He was part of the Polish Resistance Army and was executed by the Germans.

References

1893 births
1942 deaths
Sportspeople from Kielce
Polish male sport shooters
ISSF rifle shooters
Olympic shooters of Poland
Shooters at the 1936 Summer Olympics
Olympic bronze medalists for Poland
Olympic medalists in shooting
Medalists at the 1936 Summer Olympics
Polish military personnel killed in World War II
Home Army members
Resistance members killed by Nazi Germany
Polish people executed by Nazi Germany